Gavin Charles Schmitt (born 27 January 1986) is a former Canadian volleyball player, who started playing volleyball in Saskatoon for the Saskatchewan Huskies volleyball club and eventually went on to win the silver medal with the Canada men's national volleyball team at the 2013 NORCECA Volleyball Championship in Langley, Canada.

Career
From 2009 to 2012, Schmitt played for the Daejeon Samsung Bluefangs in South Korea's V-League, where he led the team to three consecutive titles winning the MVP awards in the 2009–10 and 2011–12 seasons.

Schmitt led the national team in scoring in six of the seven matches he played for Canada at the 2014 World Championship in Poland, where Canada finished seventh for its best result ever in the championship that has been held 18 times since 1949.

In July 2016, he was named to Canada's 2016 Olympic team.

Sporting achievements
 CSV South American Club Championship
  Brazil 2016 – with Funvic Taubaté
 National championships
2009/2010  KOVO Cup, with Daejeon Samsung
 2009/2010   V-League Championship, with Daejeon Samsung
 2010/2011   V-League Championship, with Daejeon Samsung
 2011/2012   V-League Championship, with Daejeon Samsung
 2014/2015   Turkish Championship, with Arkas Izmir
 2018/2019  Greek Championship, with Olympiacos Piraeus
 2018/2019  Greek Cup, with Olympiacos Piraeus
 National team
 2008  Pan American Cup
 2009  Pan American Cup
 2011  Pan American Cup
 2011  NORCECA Championship
 2013  NORCECA Championship
 2015  Pan American Games

Individually
 2008: Pan American Cup – Best Opposite
 2009: Pan American Cup – Best Scorer
 2010: V-League Championship – Most Valuable Player
 2010: V-League Championship – Best Scorer
 2010: V-League Championship – Best Opposite
 2010: V-League Championship – Best Server
 2011: V-League Championship – Best Scorer
 2011: Pan American Cup – Best Opposite
 2011: Pan American Cup – Best Scorer
 2012: V-League Championship – Most Valuable Player
 2012: V-League Championship – Best Scorer
 2012: V-League Championship – Best Opposite
 2015: Turkish Championship – Most Valuable Player
 2015: Turkish Championship – Best Scorer
 2015: Turkish Championship – Best Opposite
 2015: Turkish Championship – Best Server
 2015: Pan American Games – Best Scorer, Best Server
 2016: 1st World Olympic Qualification Tournament – Best Opposite Spiker

Records
 2011/2012: 58 points in one match in – V-League

References

1986 births
Living people
People from Grande Prairie
Sportspeople from Alberta
Sportspeople from Saskatoon
Canadian men's volleyball players
Saskatchewan Huskies players
Volleyball players at the 2015 Pan American Games
Pan American Games bronze medalists for Canada
Olympiacos S.C. players
Daejeon Samsung Bluefangs players
Canadian expatriate sportspeople in Greece
Expatriate volleyball players in Greece
Canadian expatriate sportspeople in France
Expatriate volleyball players in France
Canadian expatriate sportspeople in South Korea
Expatriate volleyball players in South Korea
Canadian expatriate sportspeople in Russia
Expatriate volleyball players in Russia
Canadian expatriate sportspeople in Turkey
Expatriate volleyball players in Turkey
Canadian expatriate sportspeople in Brazil
Expatriate volleyball players in Brazil
Canadian expatriate sportspeople in Poland
Expatriate volleyball players in Poland
Resovia (volleyball) players
Volleyball players at the 2016 Summer Olympics
Pan American Games medalists in volleyball
Olympic volleyball players of Canada
Medalists at the 2015 Pan American Games
Canadian expatriate sportspeople in Japan
Expatriate volleyball players in Japan